The Berlin Hyp AG, based in Berlin, is one of the large German real estate and mortgage banks. The bank was created in 1996 from the merger of Berliner Hypotheken- und Pfandbriefbank AG and Braunschweig-Hannoversche Hypothekenbank AG.

The Berlin Hyp focuses its sales activities on business with investors, housing companies, real estate funds, investment companies and selected developers. Regionally, it concentrates on economically strong metropolitan areas in Germany and various foreign markets in Europe.

History
The Berlin Hyp's first predecessor institute, the Berliner Pfandbriefinstitut, was founded in 1868. Later, the institute operated under the name of Berliner Pfandbriefamt. In 1973, a number of public institutions were incorporated under the name Berliner Pfandbrief-Bank as a public-law institution:

 Stadtschaft der Mark Brandenburg
 Berliner Hypothekenbankverein (Stadtschaft)
 Preußische Zentralstadtschaft
 Brandenburgische Provinzialbank und Girozentrale
 Brandenburgischer Sparkassen- und Giroverband
 Kur- und Neumärkische Ritterschaftliche Darlehens-Kasse, Märkische Landschaft, 

In 1993, the legal form was changed to a Joint-stock company. Since this change, the bank has been operating as Berliner Hypotheken- und Pfandbriefbank AG (short: Berlin Hyp). The sole shareholder was the state of Berlin. In 1994, a predecessor institution of today's Landesbank Berlin took over all shares. The current bank was created in 1996 from the merger of Berliner Hypotheken- und Pfandbriefbank AG and Braunschweig-Hannoversche Hypothekenbank AG.

In November 2009, the Berlin Hyp's Supervisory Board resolved a substantial capital increase by issuing new no-par-value shares in order to broaden the scope of action for new business acquisitions and thereby expand and consolidate its market position.

In October 2013, the company was renamed Berlin Hyp AG. Also, the brand image of the bank was completely revised and has since leaned its business colors and appearance against the image of the Sparkasse, to make the involvement of the Berlin Hyp in the Sparkassen-Finanzgruppe outwardly visible.

As of January 1, 2015, the company's shares were transferred to LBB Holding and the commercial real estate financing business, which had previously been operated jointly with Landesbank Berlin, was dissolved.

The Berlin Hyp is a member of the Verband deutscher Pfandbriefbanken.

Key figures

The bank employs 596 people (as of 2018) and has offices in Berlin (headquarters), Düsseldorf, Frankfurt, Hamburg, Munich, Stuttgart and overseas locations in Warsaw, Amsterdam and Paris.

Shareholders

Status: February 2018

Corporate publications
The Berlin Hyp regularly publishes real estate studies, some of which are own works and partly in cooperations.

 Logistik und Immobilien 2017
 Trendbarometer 2/2017
 Wohnmarktreport 2018

Significant investments
Since 2008, the Berlin Hyp holds a 100 percent stake in the now-defunct Berlin Hyp Immobilien GmbH. The Berlin Hyp's business purposes were brokerage and real estate marketing.

Brand and corporate design
At the beginning of 2013, the traditional Berliner Immobilienbank was facing a comprehensive strategic repositioning. The starting point for the rebranding was the organizational reorganization of the parent company, Landesbank Berlin (LBB). Berlin Hyp was set up as an independent real estate financier and future subsidiary of Berliner Sparkasse within the Sparkassen-Finanzgruppe. Factors of the reorientation were the now independent market position and the expansion of the range of services as a composite bank in the Sparkassen-Finanzgruppe and for real estate clients.

The slogan of the Berlin Hyp is "partnership is our foundation". The slogan represents a promise of service to its employees, customers, partners and owners. It guides the operation and emphasizes key features of the Berlin Hyp: down-to-earth, reliable, in partnership and personal.

References

External links
 Financial report of the Berlin Hyp
 

Banks of Germany
Subprime mortgage lenders
Corporate finance
Companies based in Berlin
1868 establishments in Germany
Banks established in 1868